Talmage is an unincorporated community in Dickinson County, Kansas, United States.  As of the 2020 census, the population of the city was 78.

History
In 1887, the Atchison, Topeka and Santa Fe Railway (ATSF) built a branch line from Neva (three miles west of Strong City) through Talmage to Superior, Nebraska. In 1996, the ATSF merged with the Burlington Northern Railroad, forming the current BNSF Railway. Most locals still refer to this railroad as the "Santa Fe".

The post office was established on December 22, 1887.

Geography
Talmage is located in northwestern Dickinson County, just south of state highway K-18 in the valley of Mud Creek.

Demographics

For statistical purposes, the United States Census Bureau has defined Talmage as a census-designated place (CDP).

Education
The community is served by Abilene USD 435 public school district.

References

Further reading

External links
 Photos-Talmage, Dickinson County, Kansas-Wichita State University Libraries
 Dickinson County maps: Current, Historic, KDOT

Populated places established in 1887
Census-designated places in Kansas
Census-designated places in Dickinson County, Kansas
1887 establishments in Kansas